Miss Nicaragua is an American beauty pageant that has been held annually since 1955 to select the entrant from Nicaragua in the Miss Universe and since 2023 to select the entrant to Miss Charm International pageant. Until 2001 when the model agency Siluetas announces that the most important beauty pageant in the country will be operated by Karen Celebertti.

The current Miss Nicaragua is Norma Huembes of San Marcos, who was crowned on August 6, 2022 at the Crowne Plaza Hotel and Convention Center Managua in Managua, Nicaragua.

Participants
Participants for the Miss Nicaragua contest must be between 18 and 28 years old, not married, and have no children. After participants are chosen, 16 candidates are elected and represent their region. The majority of Miss Nicaragua winners have been from Managua.

Some years, the pageant has had a theme; for 2006, it was "León, pasado maravilloso... presente esperanzador... futuro luminoso" meaning "León, wonderful past... hopeful present.. luminous future".

Despite only having four Miss Universe semi-finalists to date, Nicaragua has done well in other international beauty pageants.

since 2023 the Miss Nicaragua will accepts women married and that at the same time are mothers.

Titleholders

Regional rankings

Miss Nicaragua titleholders 
The following women have represented Nicaragua in the Miss Universe

Miss Charm Nicaragua titleholders 

Since 2022 the Miss Nicaragua organization selects the representative of Nicaragua for the Miss Charm International competition.

Notes

Contestants
The runners-up and semi-finalists of the Miss Nicaragua pageant are sometimes sent to represent Nicaragua in other international beauty pageants. Winners include Sharon Amador, the first finalist in Miss Nicaragua 2006. Sharon won the Miss Ambar Mundial pageant in 2006. 
In 2010, the franchise for Miss Earth Nicaragua was awarded to Nuestra Belleza Nicaragua.

Dethroned
Miss Nicaragua 2013, Nastassja Bolívar was dethroned after competing at the Miss Universe 2013 in Moscow, Russia.

See also

Miss Mundo Nicaragua
Nuestra Belleza Nicaragua
Nicaragua at major beauty pageants

References

External links
Miss Nicaragua Official site

 
Beauty pageants in Nicaragua
Nicaraguan awards
Nicaragua